Laxman Dutta Joshi is a Nepalese politician, belonging to the Communist Party of Nepal. In the 2008 Constituent Assembly election he was elected from the Darchula-1 constituency, winning 25404 votes.

References

Living people
Communist Party of Nepal (Maoist Centre) politicians
Nepalese atheists
Year of birth missing (living people)

Members of the 1st Nepalese Constituent Assembly